Half Past Dead is a 2002 American action film written and directed by Don Michael Paul in his directorial debut, and produced by Steven Seagal, who also starred in the lead role, alongside Andrew Stevens and Elie Samaha. The film co-stars Morris Chestnut, Ja Rule, Tony Plana, Kurupt, and Nia Peeples. The film tells the story of a criminal who infiltrates a prison to interrogate a prisoner about the location of a fortune in gold while an undercover FBI agent has to stop him. Distribution and copyrights were held by Columbia Pictures. Half Past Dead was released on November 15, 2002 by Screen Gems. The film grossed $19 million worldwide against its budget of $25 million. 

Half Past Dead was Seagal's last film to be given a wide theatrical release in the United States until 2010’s Machete, and remains as both his last star vehicle produced by a major Hollywood studio and the only one to be given a PG-13 rating by the Motion Picture Association of America.

Plot
In San Francisco, FBI agent Sasha Petrosevitch (Steven Seagal) goes undercover as a Russian car thief and is brought in by criminal Nick Frazier (Ja Rule) to work for crime boss Sonny Eckvall (Richard Bremmer), who apparently shot and killed Sasha's wife. After some time, FBI Special Agent Ellen Williams (Claudia Christian) and her team show up to nail Nick, but things go wrong, and Sasha gets shot.

After eight months of recovery following his brief bout of being clinically dead from the shooting, Sasha is incarcerated along with Nick in the newly reopened Alcatraz prison. Run by the charismatic warden, Juan Ruiz "El Fuego" Escarzaga (Tony Plana), the place is known for its new state of the art death chamber where the condemned can choose from five different ways to die: lethal injection, gas chamber, hanging, firing squad, or electric chair.

Lester McKenna (Bruce Weitz) is the first death row prisoner brought to the new Alcatraz and also the first prisoner scheduled to be executed. An older man, he stole $200,000,000 worth of gold bricks in a heist that resulted in five deaths and hid the loot at an unknown location. Federal Bureau of Prisons head Frank Hubbard (Stephen J. Cannell) and Supreme Court Justice Jane McPherson (Linda Thorson) have arrived to witness the execution, which is a result of Jane sentencing Lester.

But she's not the only one interested in Lester. A small but well-equipped team of terrorists who call themselves the "49ers" have parachuted onto the Alcatraz island and gained control of it. Led by 49er One, a.k.a. Hubbard's assistant Donny Johnson (Morris Chestnut), and 49er Six (Nia Peeples), the team finds Lester, and they want him to give up the location of his hidden stash of gold. When Lester will not tell them, Donny shoots a nearby priest (Eva-Maria Schönecker) and threatens to kill others if the information is not delivered.

Donny's plan is disrupted, however, when Sascha decides to step in and fight back. At this point, Sasha's true identity is revealed and he used Nick to get to Sonny Eckvall, whom he seeks revenge on for the death of his wife. When Sasha rescues Lester, the 49ers strap Jane to the electric chair and threaten to kill her, all while Ellen and her team prepare a rescue plan from the mainland.

With the help of Nick and some of the other inmates such as Twitch (Kurupt) and Little Joe (Michael "Bear" Taliferro), Sasha sets out to rescue Jane and bring Donny down, before Alcatraz becomes everyone's final resting place. The conflict culminates in the 49ers taking McPherson and Lester on a helicopter and departing with Sascha in pursuit. Donny attempts to buy time by throwing MacPherson out of the helicopter, but Sascha dives after her and manages to save her, while Lester reveals that he was previously given an improvised bomb vest of grenades that he sets off, having already accepted his death. Sasha subsequently leads the investigators to the gold, Lester having told him its location before his death. 

A month later, Nick, having previously learnt of Sasha's reasons for hunting Sonny, is still recovering in prison, but is informed in a meeting with Sasha that he is being released early for his role in the hostage crisis.

Cast

 Steven Seagal as Sasha Petrosevitch
 Morris Chestnut as Donny Johnson "49er One"
 Ja Rule as Nick Frazier
 Nia Peeples as "49er Six"
 Tony Plana as Warden Juan Ruiz "El Fuego" Escarzaga
 Kurupt as "Twitch"
 Michael "Bear" Taliferro as "Little Joe"
 Claudia Christian as FBI Special Agent Ellen Williams
 Linda Thorson as Judge Jane McPherson
 Bruce Weitz as Lester McKenna
 Michael McGrady as Guard Damon J. Kestner
 Richard Bremmer as Sonny Eckvall
 Hannes Jaenicke as FBI Agent Hartmann
 Mo'Nique as Twitch's Girl
 Stephen J. Cannell as Frank Hubbard
 Matt Battaglia as "49er Three"
 Wiliam T. Bowers as Alcatraz Guard

Production
The film was at one stage known as Lockdown and was shot in Germany.

Release

Home media
It was released on DVD in the US on March 4, 2003.

Reception

Box office
Half Past Dead was released on November 15, 2002, in the United States, where it grossed $7.8 million on its opening weekend. It grossed $15.5 million in the US and another $3.7 million outside the US, for a total worldwide gross of $19.2 million.

Critical response
Rotten Tomatoes, a review aggregator, reports that 3% of 87 surveyed critics gave the film a positive review; the average rating is 3/10.  The site's consensus reads: "Seagal is now too bulky to make a convincing action hero, and Half Past Dead is too silly and incoherent to deliver any visceral kicks."  Metacritic rated it 23/100 based on 23 reviews. Audiences polled by CinemaScore gave the film an average grade of "B" on an A+ to F scale.

Critic Roger Ebert wrote, "Half Past Dead is like an alarm that goes off with nobody in the room. It does its job, stops, and nobody cares."

Seagal was nominated for Worst Actor at the 2002 Stinkers Bad Movie Awards and the 2003 Golden Raspberry Awards.

Sequel
Half Past Dead 2 was released direct-to-video on May 15, 2007. The film does not feature actors Steven Seagal or Ja Rule. The starring characters were Twitch (Kurupt) and Burke (Bill Goldberg).

References

External links

 
 
 

2002 films
2002 action films
2002 directorial debut films
Alcatraz Island in fiction
American action films
American gangster films
American prison films
Films about race and ethnicity
Films about terrorism in the United States
Films about the Federal Bureau of Investigation
Films directed by Don Michael Paul
Films produced by Elie Samaha
Films scored by Tyler Bates
Films set in Berlin
Films set in San Francisco
Franchise Pictures films
Screen Gems films
2000s English-language films
English-language German films
2000s American films
English-language action films